Fadin may refer to:

 Famotidine, a drug that inhibits stomach acid production

People with the surname
 Victor Sergeevich Fadin (born 1942), Russian theoretical physicist